Front Lot is a themed land or studio lot at Walt Disney Studios Park in Disneyland Paris, based on the glamorous administration areas of Hollywood movie studios from the "golden age" of movies in the 1930s. It serves as the main entrance area of the park, similar to Main Street USA, with park services and several boutiques. Earffel Tower, the park's icon, is located in this area.

Its focal point, Disney Studio 1, is based on the first soundstage ever owned by Walt Disney himself, at the original Disney Bros. Studios on Hyperion Avenue, Burbank, California. The central square is named Place des Frères Lumière, featuring a bronze-effect fountain - the Fantasia Fountain - at its heart.

Attractions
Disney Studio 1

Restaurants
Restaurant En Coulisse
Club Swankadero Coffee

Shops
Walt Disney Studios Store
Les Légends d'Hollywood
Studio Photo

References

 
Themed areas in Walt Disney Parks and Resorts
Walt Disney Studios Park